Radio Exe (formerly Exeter FM) is an independent local radio station based in Exeter, Devon, England.

Presenters 
Presenters include Matt Rogers, Neil Walker, Ashley Jeary, Dean Brame, Jamie Taylor, Nino Firetto and Paul Nero. Former presenter Simon Jupp was elected as MP for East Devon in the 2019 United Kingdom general election.

History
Exeter FM launched on 18 February 2008 as part of the London-based Sunrise Radio Group.

In June 2011, the station was taken over by Exe Broadcasting Ltd, a new company owned by local broadcaster Paul Nero. The station relaunched as Radio Exe on Tuesday 10 January 2012 at 7:55am, when breakfast presenter Ben Clark played Billy Joel’s 'River of Dreams'.

In August 2016, Devon Radio Ltd, owned fully by Celador Radio, sold their 40% share in Radio Exe. This also led to the resignation of Paul Smith, a director of the station who is also the chairman of Celador, resulting in the station becoming 100% locally controlled and owned.

In 2020, during the COVID-19 pandemic, the station launched an emergency fundraising drive to keep the station local due to a lack of advertising revenue and other factors. The fundraiser was successful with £45,919 raised.

On 4 March 2022, Radio Exe launched on the Plymouth DAB multiplex. This move expanded its coverage to encompass the whole of West Devon.

In 2020, Ofcom advertised a smallscale local DAB multiplex for Exeter (as part of a range of new such multiplexes being commissioned across the country). The Exeter licence was won by ExeDAB, a consortium of Radio Exe, Exeter community station Phonic FM and Torbay community service Riviera FM. This multiplex began broadcasting in November 2022.

In 2022, Ofcom advertised a similar multiplex for Torbay. TorDAB, a consortium of Radio Exe, online station South Devon Radio and newspaper publisher Clear Sky Publishing competed for the franchise against a rival consortium including Riviera FM, Like Media and UK DAB Networks Ltd, a firm which manages several other of the smallscale licences around the UK. In January 2023 TorDAB was awarded the licence.

In March 2023 a smallscale multiplex to serve Plymouth was awarded to PlymDAB Ltd, a firm backed by Radio Exe in partnership with Exeter Community Radio Ltd, Hospital Radio Plymouth and Westward Media Ltd - this was chosen by Ofcom in preference to a rival bid (Plymouth DAB Ltd) whose backers included Like Media and UK DAB Networks, with Riviera FM a minority stakeholder.

In January 2023, the Radio Today website reported that 16-year-old Josh Tate, who reads the sports news for the station, was believed to be the UK's youngest newsreader.  Tate subsequently made an appearance on Matt Chorley's show on Times Radio, where he was invited to read the midday news.

References

External links
 
 Radio Exe - listen live - Live streaming

Radio stations in Devon
Radio stations established in 2008